Imamuddin Murtaza Khan Babi (Gujarati: બાબી ઈમામુદ્દીનખાન મુર્તઝાખાન), better known by his pen name Ruswa Majhalumi (Gujarati: રુસ્વા મઝલૂમી), was a Gujarati language poet and a royal of Pajod state. He was born in Mangrol on 11 December 1915. He studied at the Rajkumar College, Rajkot from 1927 to 1934. Meena (1948) and Madira (1972) are two of his collections of Ghazal poetry. Dhalta Minara (1978) is an episodic portrait by him.

He died on 14 February 2008.

He belonged to Babi Dynasty and was the Chief of Pajod and associate of Sardargadh.

His son, Ayaazkhan Babi also studied at the  Rajkumar College, Rajkot like his father and was the Principal having lived on the campus more than half his life.

References

Gujarati-language writers
Indian male poets
Poets from Gujarat
Gujarati-language poets
20th-century Indian poets
Indian people of Pashtun descent
1915 births
2008 deaths
20th-century Indian male writers